The New Zealand Kennel Club (now known as Dogs News Zealand, and also known as Dogs NZ and NZKC) is the primary kennel club responsible for dog pedigree registration services in New Zealand. They also provide training services, judging for dog shows and many other services relating to dog showing. The organisation was introduced in 1886, and changed its name in 2017 to Dogs New Zealand. Dogs New Zealand is a member of the FCI.

Operation 
The New Zealand Kennel Club is an organisation that operates at two levels, which includes the Affiliated Societies and Individual Membership. NZKC now has over 300 societies affiliated to, associated with and recognised by it. There are several types of Associated clubs include the Show Clubs; the Obedience Clubs; the Combined Show and Obedience Clubs and the Agility Clubs. Recognised Clubs are either clubs which cater for minority breeds, newly formed clubs or clubs that do not cater show or Dog Training.

NZKC Administration 
The Club's administrative office is at Prosser Street, Porirua, Wellington, next to the Exhibition Centre. Administration looks after the day-to-day management of the New Zealand Kennel Club. Administration deals mainly with the register, membership matters, the NZ Dog World and the website.

References

External links
Official Website of the New Zealand Kennel Club

Fédération Cynologique Internationale
Kennel clubs
1886 establishments in New Zealand
Organizations established in 1886